Sunriver Airport  is a public use airport located one nautical mile (2 km) west of the central business district of Sunriver, in Deschutes County, Oregon, United States. It is privately owned by Sunriver Resort, L.P. This airport is included in the National Plan of Integrated Airport Systems for 2011–2015, which categorized it as a general aviation facility.

It is used by travelers/private jets, glider tours around the area, and other uses to the public. It is located near the Sunriver Resort. It has enough parking spaces to hold 170 aircraft; 16 of the parking spaces are specifically designed for multi-engine piston and jet aircraft. The airport is also serviced by Enterprise Rental Car.

Facilities and aircraft 
Sunriver Airport covers an area of 108 acres (44 ha) at an elevation of 4,164 feet (1,269 m) above mean sea level. It has one runway designated 18/36 with an asphalt surface measuring 5,455 by 75 feet (1,663 x 23 m).

For the 12-month period ending February 23, 2010, the airport had 6,150 aircraft operations, an average of 16 per day: 89% general aviation, 10% air taxi, and 1% military. At that time there were 71 aircraft based at this airport: 68% single-engine, 21% multi-engine, 6% jet, 3% helicopter, and 3% glider.

See also 
 Deschutes River
 Sunriver Observatory

References

External links 
 Aerial image as of July 1994 from USGS The National Map
 
 

Airports in Deschutes County, Oregon